Randy West may refer to: 

 Randy West, announcer on the game show Supermarket Sweep and other game shows
 Randy West (actor), pornographic actor and director
 Randy West (photographer), photographer